Center is an unincorporated community in Jefferson County, Washington, United States.  Center was so named because it was at one point considered to be the center of Jefferson County, although it is now significantly to the east.  Center is not a town, but rather the name often applied to this residential part of the county.

References

Unincorporated communities in Washington (state)
Unincorporated communities in Jefferson County, Washington